Henry Beauchamp Oliver St John, 18th Baron St John of Bletso DL (24 June 1876 – 17 October 1920) was an English peer.

He was the eldest son of Beauchamp St John, 17th Baron St John of Bletso, and his wife Helen Thornton.  He was educated at Wellington College and Magdalene College, Cambridge. On 26 July 1901, he was made a deputy lieutenant of Bedfordshire. Henry became the 17th Lord St John on the death of his father in 1912, and inherited Melchbourne Park. He was a JP for Bedfordshire and described as Church of England Conservative.

He died unmarried at the age of 44 and was succeeded by his younger brother, Moubray.

References

 Burke's Baronetage & Peerage

1876 births
1920 deaths
Alumni of Magdalene College, Cambridge
Deputy Lieutenants of Bedfordshire
People educated at Wellington College, Berkshire
Henry
Barons St John of Bletso